Dundee United Methodist Church is a historic Methodist church located at Dundee in Yates County, New York. It is a Gothic Revival style brick and frame structure built in 1899. The entrance features a paneled double door surmounted by a large, stained glass, Gothic arched transom light trimmed with splayed brick lintels. It was listed on the National Register of Historic Places in 2004.

References

Churches on the National Register of Historic Places in New York (state)
Methodist churches in New York (state)
Gothic Revival church buildings in New York (state)
Churches completed in 1899
19th-century Methodist church buildings in the United States
Churches in Yates County, New York
National Register of Historic Places in Yates County, New York